Halley is an unincorporated community and census-designated place (CDP) in Desha County, Arkansas, United States. It was first listed as a CDP in the 2020 census with a population of 44.

History

John J. Bowie (eldest brother of James Bowie) purchased land in the area in 1857.

The line passed through Bowie's land, and a stop there was called "Bowie Station". The railroad was completed after the war, but abandoned in 1875 after flooding on the Mississippi River damaged the railbed and bridges. Highway 208 between Eunice and Halley was built on the abandoned railbed.

Bowie Station was later renamed "Halley" after early settlers, the Halley family.

In 1901, a line of the Missouri Pacific Railroad was built through Halley.

Demographics

2020 census

Note: the US Census treats Hispanic/Latino as an ethnic category. This table excludes Latinos from the racial categories and assigns them to a separate category. Hispanics/Latinos can be of any race.

Infrastructure
The Halley Volunteer Fire Department is located in the settlement.

Education
It is in the Dermott School District.

Notable person
 Dewey Corley (1898–1974) – blues multi-instrumentalist musician in Memphis jug band ensembles, who was born in Halley.

References

Unincorporated communities in Desha County, Arkansas
Unincorporated communities in Arkansas
Census-designated places in Arkansas